Certificate of Achievement may refer to:

 Entry Level Certificate, a qualification in England, Wales and Northern Ireland, formerly known as the Certificate of Achievement
 National Certificate of Educational Achievement, a qualification in New Zealand
 Segrave Certificate of Achievement, a subsidiary award of the Segrave Trophy